Gerdekan-e Ahmadi (also Romanized as Gerdekān-e Aḩmadī and Gardekān-e Aḩmadī; also known as Gardekān) is a village in Ahmadi Rural District, Ahmadi District, Hajjiabad County, Hormozgan Province, Iran. At the 2006 census, its population was 51, in 13 families.

References 

Populated places in Hajjiabad County